This is a list of mountains of the Swiss canton of Bern. Bern is one of the three cantons (with Valais and Graubünden) having summits above 4,000 metres. It is also one of the two cantons (with Vaud) extending over both the Alps and Jura. Topographically, the most important summit of the canton is that of the Finsteraarhorn (most elevated, most prominent and most isolated).

This list only includes significant summits with a topographic prominence of at least . There are over 160 such summits in the canton of Bern and they are mostly found in the Bernese Oberland and the Bernese Jura, in its southernmost and northernmost districts. All mountain heights and prominences on the list are from the largest-scale maps available.

List

Notes

References

Bern